Leo Koswal (born 13 October 1975) is a Dutch former professional footballer who played as a forward. He made his Eredivisie debut with club FC Dordrecht during the 1994–95 season. Koswal also played for clubs Vitesse Arnhem, MVV Maastricht, TOP Oss, FC Emmen, and SBV Excelsior.

References

External links
 
 

1975 births
Living people
Dutch sportspeople of Surinamese descent
Dutch footballers
Footballers from Breda
Association football forwards
Eredivisie players
Eerste Divisie players
FC Dordrecht players
TOP Oss players
SBV Vitesse players
MVV Maastricht players
Excelsior Rotterdam players
FC Emmen players